The Lumberjack World Championships are held annually in Hayward, Wisconsin. The event began in 1960 and is held at the Lumberjack Bowl. There are 21 events for both men and women to compete for over $50,000 in prize money. Contestants come from the United States, Canada, Australia, and New Zealand. The events include sawing, chopping, logrolling, and climbing to test the strength and agility of over 100 competitors.

There were no events planned for 2020.

List of Lumberjack World Championship
Competitions by year:

Women's events

Women's single buck
Competitors saw through a  white pine log for the fastest time. A starting cut arc is allowed in the competition. Timing begins when the signal "GO" is called and ends when the log is completely severed. The world record with a time of 11.61 seconds was set in 2006 by Nancy Zalewski.

Women's underhand chop
Nancy Zalewski held the world record in 2009 with a time of 29.24 seconds. Erin Lavoie claimed the record with a time of 25.38 seconds at the Manitoba Lumberjack Championship on Sept. 27, 2016.

Women's log rolling
Opponents step onto a floating log, cuff it to start the roll, spin it rapidly in the water with their feet, stop or snub it suddenly by digging into the log with special caulked birling shoes and a reverse motion to maneuver their adversaries off balance and into the water, a feat called 'wetting'. Dislodging an opponent constitutes a fall. The cardinal rule of logrolling is 'never take your eyes off your opponent's feet'. The referee starts each match. Competing birlers step off a dock onto a floating log, grasping pike poles held by attendants for balance. As they push off from the dock, the referee instructs the birlers to steady the log. When he is certain both birlers have equal control, he says, 'Throw your poles'. The match is on and continues to a fall or to expiration of the time limit set for each log. When the time limit is reached, the same match continues onto the next smaller log. In all rounds, the contest is decided by the best three out of five falls. Women start on  logs. In 2003 Tina Bosworth set a new world record of 10 wins.

Women's boom run
Starting on the log-rolling dock, two competitors run head to head on adjacent booms. Each competitor must step off the logrolling dock, running across a chain of logrolling logs to the chopping dock, circling a specified competition station and cross the pond on the boom logs back to the logrolling dock. The competitor must step onto the logrolling dock and touch the starting point. This is a timed event and is timed to the tenths of a second. Anyone leaving before the word "go" will be assessed a 10-second penalty.

Men's events

Underhand block chop
Timing begins on the signal "go" and ends when the log is severed. A new world record was set in 2006 by Jason Wynyard with a time of 15.94. In 2007, competitors moved from the underhand chop to the standing block chop for one continuous timed event known as the endurance event.

Standing block chop
Timing begins on the "go" signal and ends when the log is severed. This event was combined with the men's underhand chop as the endurance or combination event in 2007. Competitors moved from the underhand chop to the standing block chop for one continuous timed event. The world record for the standing block chop is 12.33 seconds set by Jason Wynyard from New Zealand in 2007.

Springboard chop
This event combines the skills of the chopper and the high climber. Out in the forest this technique enables a working lumberjack to reach softer wood above the tough and knotty base of a tree marked for cutting. Contestants climb a height of nine feet using two springboard placements and chop through a  aspen log mounted on the top of the spar pole. Dave Bolstad set a new world record of 41.15 in 2003 besting his previous world record time of 41.63 in 2001.

Single buck
A single sawyer uses a one-man bucking saw to cut through a  white pine log for the best time. Dion Lane set a new world record in 2006 with a time of 10.78 seconds.

Hot saw

A single sawyer using a single-cylinder, single-motor power saw makes three vertical cuts—down, up and down—through a  white pine log. This one-man contest is strictly against time. Chain saws may be warmed up prior to the contest, but must be turned off before the contest begins. Neither self-starting nor impulse-type push button starters nor twin motors are allowed. A starter gives the countdown and on the signal "go", competitors start their saws and make the three cuts. The contest ends when the third slice is severed. All cuts must be complete. Dave Bolstad of New Zealand holds the world record with a time of 5.55 seconds set in 2007.

60-foot speed climb
Competitor scales a  cedar spar pole and returns to the ground. Contestants perform on twin spar poles and they must climb within 240 degrees of the sparring pole, as marked. Event is strictly against time and begins when the signal "go" is given and ends when the contestant touches the ground after climbing to the 60-foot mark. At the starting signal, contestants must have one foot on the ground and the other foot below the orange line as marked on the sparring pole. The contestant must touch the pole every 15 feet on the descent. The two climbers use spurred climbers and steel-core climbing ropes to scale the spar poles. Only traditional spurs are allowed. Brian Bartow of Grants Pass, Oregon holds the world record of 12.33 seconds in this event.

90-foot speed climb
Contestant scales a  cedar spar pole and returns to the ground against time. Contestants compete on twin spar poles. Contestant must climb within the front 240 degrees of the sparring pole, as marked. Timing begins on the signal "go" and ends when the contestant touches the ground after ringing one of the two bells on top of the spar pole. At the starting signal, contestants must have one foot on the ground and the other foot below the orange line as marked on the sparring pole. On the descent climbers are required to touch inside each section. Contestants use spurred climbers and steel-core climbing ropes to scale the spar poles. In this climb Brian Bartow of Oregon holds the world record with a time of 19.87 set in 2006.

Logrolling (birling)

In competition, opponents step onto a floating log, cuff it to start the roll, spin it rapidly in the water with their feet, stop or snub it suddenly by digging into the log with special caulked birling shoes and a reverse motion to maneuver their adversaries off balance and into the water, a feat called 'wetting'. Dislodging an opponent constitutes a fall. The cardinal rule of logrolling is 'never take your eyes off your opponent's feet'. The referee starts each match. Competing birlers step off a dock onto a floating log, grasping pike poles held by attendants for balance. As they push off from the dock, the referee instructs the birlers to steady the log. When he is certain both birlers have equal control, he says, 'Throw your poles'. The match is on and continues to a fall or to expiration of the time limit set for each log. When the time limit is reached, the same match continues onto the next smaller log. In the semi-finals and the finals, the contest is decided by the best three out of five falls. Men start on  logs.

Boom run
Starting on the log-rolling dock, two competitors run head to head on adjacent booms. Each competitor must step off the logrolling dock, running across a chain of logrolling logs to the chopping dock, circling a specified competition station and cross the pond on the boom logs back to the logrolling dock. The competitor must step onto the logrolling dock and touch the starting point. This is a timed event and is timed to the tenths of a second. Anyone leaving before the word "go" will be assessed a 10-second penalty.

Team events

Jack and Jill
A bucking contests where a man and woman compete for the best time to cut through a  white pine log. Timing starts on the signal "go" and ends when the block is severed. Logs must be cut completely through. The world record for this event was set in 2005 by Jason and Karmyn Wynyard with a time of 6.17 seconds.

Double buck
Two sawyers working as a team use a two-man bucking saw to cut through a  white pine log. Double buck team consists of two men. A starting cut arc is allowed. Timing begins for both competitions when the signal to "go" is called, and ends when the log is completely severed. Jason Wynyard and Dion Lane hold the world record with a time of 4.77 seconds set in 2005.

Team relay
In this timed event there are two teams competing. Each team consist of a 60-foot climber, 2 boom runners (1 male, 1 female), a hot sawyer, a women's single buck sawyer and a standing block chopper. First a climber must climb and descend the 60-foot pole, when their feet touch the pad it is the signal for the male boom runner stationed on the chopping dock to run the logs to the logrolling dock; when he touches the dock it is then the female boom runner's turn to run the logs over to the chopping dock, once touching there the hot saws then cut through a  log and when the log drops the women commence the single buck, with the standing block chop the anchor event in this relay. Whichever team finishes first with the best time is the winner of the event. This event is the combination of the best of all the lumberjack skills: power, strength and sheer determination.

Awards

All-Around Lady Jill
The All-Around Lady Jill Champion is awarded each year to the Lumber Jill who scores the most points. The key to the All-Around title is endurance and the ability to compete in as many events as possible. The top contestants in every event receive points each day of the competition, making it important to make it through early qualifying rounds in as many events as possible. Points are given each day for the top six places in each event, with a first place being awarded 6 points, second 5 points and so on. Logrollers will receive triple points for their final placement. This is because the final standings are the only opportunity for logrollers to earn points. Women's All-Around events are the underhand chop, single buck, Jack and Jill, logrolling and the boom run. The 2009 winner was Nancy Zalewski of Wisconsin, who has now taken home the crown five times.

Tony Wise All-Around Champion
The Tony Wise All-Around Champion, named after the founder of the Lumberjack World Championships, is awarded each year to the lumberjack who scores the most points. The key to the All-Around title is endurance and the ability to compete in as many events as possible. The top contestants in every event receive points each day of competition, making it important to make it through early qualifying rounds in as many events as possible. Points are given each day for the top six places in each event, with a first place being awarded 6 points, second 5 points and so on. There are two exceptions to this. Due to the nature of the springboard chop and logrolling, the all-around points for these two events will be scored differently. For the springboard, the sixth fastest competitors from Friday's and Saturday's heats receive double the points. This is because springboard competitors only get one opportunity to earn all-around points. 5th and 6th placements are awarded triple points for their final placement. This is because the final standings are the only opportunity for logrollers to earn points. The Tony Wise All-Around events are: underhand chop, standing chop, springboard chop, double buck, single buck, hot saw, Jack & Jill, logrolling, boom run, 60-foot climb and 90-foot climb. Jason Wynyard, who was the 2009 winner, has taken home the crown for 11 years in a row.

Sponsors
The event is sponsored by various companies such as Stihl, Plum Creek Timber, SBI Pepsi, and the local radio stations.

See also
 Stihl Timbersports Series
 Wood chopping
 Woodsman
 World Logging Championship

References

External links

Annual sporting events in the United States
Festivals in Wisconsin
Forestry events
International sports competitions hosted by the United States
Lumberjack sports
Multi-sport events in the United States
Recurring sporting events established in 1960
Tourist attractions in Sawyer County, Wisconsin